Alder Coppice is a local nature reserve in West Midlands, England. It is near Sedgley, next to the Northway Estate, in the Metropolitan Borough of Dudley.

Description
It is an ancient woodland, area , maintained by Dudley Metropolitan Borough Council. It was designated a local nature reserve in November 2019.

There are pathways through the wood, including three waymarked pathways of differing lengths. There are tree-stump seats around the wood. Birds can be seen including woodpeckers; flowers to be seen when in season include displays of bluebells, and wild garlic.

A feature is the "Conversation Crescent", funded by Age UK Dudley: this is a crescent of benches, arranged to allow visitors to easily see and speak to one another or to enjoy space and solitude if they prefer; to encourage conversation but not demand it.

References

Local Nature Reserves in the West Midlands (county)
Forests and woodlands of the West Midlands (county)
Metropolitan Borough of Dudley
Ancient woods in England